Slyuda was a rural locality (classified as an inhabited locality) in Kovdorsky District of Murmansk Oblast, Russia, located beyond the Arctic Circle at a height of  above sea level. It was abolished effective November 1, 2007.

References

Rural localities in Murmansk Oblast